Highway 162 is a two-lane controlled access highway on Boularderie Island in Nova Scotia, Canada.

Highway 162 was constructed in the late 1970s to link Highway 105 in Bras d'Or to the now-closed Prince Mine at Point Aconi. In the early 1990s the highway was extended another 2 kilometres to terminate at the Point Aconi Generating Station.

Major intersections

References

Nova Scotia provincial highways
Roads in the Cape Breton Regional Municipality
Limited-access roads in Canada